is a lake in Schleswig-Holstein, Germany. At an elevation of 4 m, its surface area is 14.3 km².

Amidst the lake is an island upon which the City of Ratzeburg is located, accessible from the mainland via three isthmuses. The island is home to the Old Town, including a cathedral - one of the oldest in Germany. At the end of the 17th century, the old castle at the western end of the island was completely destroyed and the site has since been degraded to a mere parking lot.

External links 
 

Lakes of Schleswig-Holstein
Ratzeburg
LRatzeburgerSee